Tai Tau Leng is a Punti walled village in Sheung Shui, North District, Hong Kong.

Administration
Tai Tau Leng is a recognized village under the New Territories Small House Policy.

See also
 Walled villages of Hong Kong

References

External links

 Delineation of area of existing village Tai Tau Leng (Sheung Shui) for election of resident representative (2019 to 2022)

Walled villages of Hong Kong
Sheung Shui
Villages in North District, Hong Kong